Stewart-Hawley-Malloy House is a historic home located near Laurinburg, Scotland County, North Carolina. It was built about 1800, and is a transitional Georgian / Federal style frame dwelling. It consists of a two-story, five bay by two bay, main block with a one-story, two bay by four bay, wing.  The main block has a full-width, one-story front porch and rear shed additions.  It was built by North Carolina politician James Stewart (1775-1821) and the birthplace of Connecticut politician Joseph Roswell Hawley (1826-1905).

It was added to the National Register of Historic Places in 1975.

References

External links

Houses on the National Register of Historic Places in North Carolina
Georgian architecture in North Carolina
Federal architecture in North Carolina
Houses completed in 1800
Houses in Scotland County, North Carolina
National Register of Historic Places in Scotland County, North Carolina